Hotel San Remo may refer to:

Hooters Casino Hotel -Las Vegas, formerly the Hotel San Remo Casino and Resort, or simply San Remo
Hotel San Remo (Ibiza)